Dranda Cathedral is a Georgian Orthodox Cathedral located in , in the Gulripshi District of the de facto independent Republic of Abkhazia, internationally recognised to constitute a part of Georgia.

According to the Roman historian Procopius of Caesarea, in 551 emperor Justinian I built a temple in these environs; this is believed by some to have been what is now the cathedral in Dranda. In the Georgian Orthodox Catholicate of Abkhazia, Dranda was the seat of a bishop.

There has been some restoration on the exterior walls of the structure and roof, covering with stucco much of the original brick architecture that was once visible. Small portions may still be seen in what was intentionally left untouched.

Gallery

References

External links

 Photographs and background information 

Orthodox cathedrals in Abkhazia
Georgian Orthodox cathedrals in Georgia (country)
6th-century churches
Immovable Cultural Monuments of National Significance of Georgia
Buildings of Justinian I